Pittman is a surname. Notable people with the surname include:

Politics
Anastasia Pittman (born 1970), Oklahoma politician
Bobby J. Pittman, American politician, former Special Assistant to the President (2006–2009)
Charles Pittman (politician), former Mississippi state senator
Joe Pittman (politician) (born 1976 or 1977), Pennsylvania politician
Key Pittman (1872–1940), United States Senator from Nevada
Vail M. Pittman (1880–1964), governor of Nevada

Sports
Anthony Pittman (born 1996), American football player
Antonio Pittman (born 1985), American football running back
Charles Pittman (basketball) (born 1958), retired American basketball player
Charlie Pittman (born 1948), former American football player
Chase Pittman (born 1983), American football defensive end
Craig Pittman (born 1959), professional wrestler under the name of Sgt. Craig "Pitbull" Pittman
Danny Pittman (born 1958), American football player
David Pittman (born 1969), former Australian rules baller
David Pittman (football player), (born 1983), American football cornerback
Dexter Pittman (born 1988), American basketball player
Emma Pittman (born 1992), Australian rules and association footballer
Jamiyus Pittman (born 1994), American football player
Jana Pittman (born 1982), birth name of Jana Rawlinson, Australian athlete 
Jon-Paul Pittman (born 1986), American-born English footballer
Josh Pittman (born 1976), American basketball player
Michael Pittman (born 1975), American football fullback 
Michael Pittman Jr. (born 1997), American college football wide receiver 
Shawn Pittman (born 1988), American rugby player
Steve Pittman (born 1967), American soccer player

Other
Aaron Pittman, fictional character in the American TV series Revolution
Al Pittman, (1940–2001), Canadian poet and playwright
Brian Pittman (born 1980), American bassist for Relient K
Christopher Pittman (born 1989), American pre-teen convicted of murdering his grandparents in 2001
Eliana Pittman (born 1945), Brazilian singer
Frank Pittman (1935–2012), American psychiatrist and author
Gene "Birdlegg" Pittman (born 1947), American blues harmonicist, singer and songwriter
Sir Isaac Pitman, (1813–1897), British teacher and stenography system developer (Pittman Shorthand)
John A. Pittman (1928–1995), American soldier awarded the  Medal of Honor for action during the Korean War
Josiah Pittman (1816–1886), British organist, composer and music editor
Montgomery Pittman (1917–1962), American television writer, director, and actor
Robert W. Pittman (born 1953), American entertainment executive
Shawn Pittman (musician) (born 1974), American blues rock musician
William Sidney Pittman (1875–1958), African-American architect
William Pittman Lett (1819–1892), Irish-Canadian journalist